Jerald is a masculine given name which is a variant of Gerald, a German name meaning "rule of the spear". Gerald was brought to Great Britain by the Normans, along with variants Jerold and Jerrold, and the feminine Geraldine. Short forms include Jerry and Jere. Jerald is uncommon as a surname.

Notable people with the name Jerald include:

Given name

 Jerald Brown (born 1980), Canadian football player
 Jerald Clark (born 1963), American baseball player
 Jerald Daemyon, American jazz musician
 Jerald Ericksen (1924–2021), American mathematician
 Jerald G. Fishman (1945–2013), American electrical engineer and businessman
 Jerald B. Harkness (born 1940), American basketball player
 Jerald Hawkins (born 1993), American football player
 Jerald Honeycutt (born 1974), American professional basketball player
 Jerald Ingram (born 1960), American football coach
 J. C. Jackson (born 1995), American football player
 Jerald Johnson (born 1927), minister and emeritus general superintendent in the Church of the Nazarene
 David Jerald Lawson (1930–2007), American Methodist Pastor and University Campus Minister
 Jerald T. Milanich, American anthropologist and archaeologist specializing in Native American culture in Florida
 Jerald Moore (born 1974), American football player
 Jerald Napoles (born 1983), Filipino actor and comedian
 Lorenzo Jerald Patterson (born 1969), American rapper, member of the group N.W.A.
 Jerald S. Paul (born 1966), Principal Deputy Administrator of the National Nuclear Security Administration at the U.S. Department of Energy
 Jerald Posman, Vice President for Administration and Finance at the City College of New York
 Jerald Raymond, American politician
 Jerald D. Slack (born 1936), retired Major General in the United States Air National Guard
 Jerald Sowell (born 1974), American Football fullback
 Jerald Tanner (1938–2006), American writer about The Church of Jesus Christ of Latter-day Saints
 Jerald terHorst (1922–2010), American journalist and politician

Surname
 Penny Johnson Jerald (born 1961), American actress with an extensive career in film and television

See also
Gerald (given name)
Jerold
Jerrold

References

English given names